Margaret Rosario is a clinical psychologist who studies the development of sexual identity and health disparities associated with sexual orientation. Rosario was President of the American Psychological Association (APA) Division 44, the Society for Psychology of Sexual Orientation and Gender Diversity, from 2017-2018. Rosario received the APA Award for Distinguished Contributions to Ethnic Minority Issues in 2008. and the Society for the Scientific Study of Sexuality Distinguished Scientific Achievement Award in 2021.

Rosario is Professor of Clinical Psychology at the City College of New York and the CUNY Graduate Center, and is Director of the CUNY Health and Identity Lab.

Biography 
Rosario received her B.A. degree in Psychology at Princeton University in 1975. She attended graduate school at New York University where she obtained her Masters degree in 1983 and her Ph.D in Psychology in 1985. Her dissertation titled "Acculturation: Its causes and psychological symptom effects in Puerto Rican women" was supervised by Marybeth Shinn.

Rosario completed postdoctoral training at the HIV Center for Clinical and Behavioral Studies, Department of Psychiatry at Columbia University College of Physicians and Surgeons in 1991. Rosario is a Fellow of the American Psychological Association and the Society for the Scientific Study of Sexuality.  She has served as the Associate Editor of the Journal of Sex Research.

Rosario's research focuses on biopsychosocial factors associated with health disparities, including substance use.  Her team seeks to understand people's strengths and vulnerabilities that may directly or indirectly influence mental and physical health outcomes. Rosario's work examines how cultural and race/ethnic background characteristics affect how members of the LGBTQ community view themselves, including their sexual identity development and experiences coming out. Her research on LGBTQ youth has been supported by the National Institute of Mental Health.

Representative publications

References

External links 
 Faculty profile at City College of New York
 Faculty profile at the CUNY Graduate Center
 Margaret Rosario publications indexed by Google Scholar

Living people
American women psychologists
American women academics
Hispanic and Latino American academics
Princeton University alumni
New York University alumni
City College of New York faculty
Year of birth missing (living people)
American clinical psychologists